This is a list of the tropical number-one songs of 2016 in Panama. The charts are published by Monitor Latino, based exclusively for tropical songs on airplay across radio stations in Panama using the Radio Tracking Data, LLC in real time. The chart week runs from Monday to Sunday.

Chart history

References 

Panamanian music-related lists
Panama
2016 in Panama